Abdulrazzaq Murad (born 29 June 1990) is a Qatari handball player for Al-Gharafa and the Qatari national team.

References

External links
 

1990 births
Living people
Qatari male handball players
Handball players at the 2016 Summer Olympics
Olympic handball players of Qatar
Handball players at the 2014 Asian Games
Handball players at the 2018 Asian Games
Asian Games gold medalists for Qatar
Asian Games medalists in handball
Medalists at the 2014 Asian Games
Medalists at the 2018 Asian Games